Ivane (Vano) Nanuaschvili or Jan Nanuashvili (Georgian: ივანე (ვანო) ნანუაშვილი, ; January 1, 1902 – 1974) was a Georgian military activist, officer of the Polish Army, political emigrant. Vano Nanuashvili contributed to the popularization of the Georgian culture and history, as well as the Georgian question in the USA.

Early life and education
Vano Nanuashvili was born in Georgia on January 1, 1902. In 1912-1920, he studied in Tbilisi 5th General Education School. In 1920-1921 he is a student of the Georgian Military Academy of Tbilisi (Officers School). In March–April 1921, during the Georgian-Russian war, he participated in the battle as a cadet of the Officers’ School. After the occupation of the Democratic Republic of Georgia by the Soviet Russia, Vano Nanuashvili emigrated from his home country together with the Georgian officers.

In April–June 1921 he was in Istanbul, from June 1921 to 1922 he studied at the Greek Military Academy in Athens, in 1923-1925 he is a student of the Military Academy of Warsaw. In 1939, from the beginning of the Second World War, Vano Nanuashvili, as a member of the Polish Army, took part in the Polish war campaign against Germany. During one of the battles he was captured. In 1939-1944 he was a war prisoner in Germany. In 1944 he managed to escape from German captivity and continued to fight against German Army in Italy.

After the Second World War, Vano Nanuashvili ceased his military activity. In 1948-1951 he lived in London, in 1951 he left for the United States. He lived in New York City in 1951-1954 and later, in 1954-1960 he was in Boston where he worked as a worker in various factories. The latest period of his life, in 1960-1974 he lived in San Francisco.

Political Activity 
The purpose to regain the independence of Georgia, led Vano Nanuashvili to very dynamic activity in the period of his emigration. He founded various organizations and took active part in their activity. In 1928 he founded the Association of the Emigrated Georgian Officers. He has been its secretary for 9 years and the editor of the Georgian military and political magazine "Mkhedari". Vano Nanuashvili was one of the initiators of the edition of the magazine "Georgian Home in San Francisco". This magazine was published in Georgian and in English. Vano Nanuashvili was a member of the Executive Committee of the Occupied Nations.

Vano Nunuashvili wrote military and political articles in English. In 1956 in Boston he published his book "Power and Weakness of the Soviet Union". His book "What Everyone in the Free World Should Know about Russia" was popular in Europe and in the United States, in 2012 the book was published in Georgian language. He died in the United States.

Sources 
Vano Nanuashvili’s personal archive, preserved at the National Centre of Manuscripts (Tbilisi, Georgia)

References

External links 
 Ivane Nanuashvili at the official website of National Parliamentary Library of Georgia
 Vano Nanuashvili at Manuscript.ge

Literature 
 Grishikashvili, Ambrosi, Captain Vano Nanuashvili: Georgians in Poland, Tbilisi, 2008, p. 194–199 (Georgian: გრიშიკაშვილი, ამბროსი, კაპიტანი ვანო ნანუაშვილი: ქართველები პოლონეთში, თბილისი, 2008, გვ. 194–199).
 Murusidze, Shorena, The Archival Heritage of Ivane (Vano) Nanuashvili for the Study of the History of Georgian Political Emigration, Tbilisi, 2013, p. 137-139 (Georgian: მურუსიძე, შორენა, ივანე (ვანო) ნანუაშვილის საარქივო მემკვიდრეობა ქართული პოლიტიკური ემიგრაციის ისტორიის კვლევისათვის, თბილისი, 2013, გვ. 137-139). 

1902 births
1974 deaths
Soviet emigrants to Poland
Polish emigrants to the United States
Polish Army officers
Activists from Georgia (country)
World War II prisoners of war held by Germany
Prisoners of war from Georgia (country)